Electoral district of Korong and Eaglehawk was an electoral district of the Legislative Assembly in the Australian state of Victoria.

Korong and Eaglehawk was created when the districts of Korong and Eaglehawk were abolished in 1927. Korong and Eaglehawk was abolished when Korong was recreated in 1945.

Members for Korong and Eaglehawk

Dunstan (who was Premier 1935–1943) also represented Eaglehawk 1920–1927 and Korong 1945–1955.

Election results

See also
 Parliaments of the Australian states and territories
 List of members of the Victorian Legislative Assembly

References

Former electoral districts of Victoria (Australia)
1927 establishments in Australia
1945 disestablishments in Australia